The Lozier House and Van Riper Mill are located in Midland Park, Bergen County, New Jersey, United States. The house and mill were jointly added to the National Register of Historic Places on October 10, 1975.

See also

National Register of Historic Places listings in Bergen County, New Jersey

References

Houses on the National Register of Historic Places in New Jersey
Houses in Bergen County, New Jersey
Midland Park, New Jersey
National Register of Historic Places in Bergen County, New Jersey
Stone houses in New Jersey
New Jersey Register of Historic Places